Globulus may refer to:
 a Roman cognomen
 an Amiga game